Benjamin Eric Woolf (September 15, 1980 – February 23, 2015) was an American film and television actor. He is known for his roles in American Horror Story first and fourth seasons, in which he played Infantata and Meep, respectively. He was also a pre-school teacher.

Early life
Born September 15, 1980, Fort Collins, Colorado, in the United States, to parents Nicholas Woolf and author Marcy Luikart, Woolf grew up in Fairfield, Iowa. He moved with his family to Santa Barbara in 1999 where he was an active league pool player, improv theater performer, and karaoke enthusiast. He earned a degree in Early Childhood Education at City College, teaching in the Head Start program in Goleta until 2010. In 2002, he moved to Hollywood to pursue his dream of being an actor.

Career

In 2002, Woolf began his acting career in his musical film debut "Tap". Woolf was featured in Dead Kansas, Insidious, Haunting Charles Manson, and Woggie. However, Woolf was perhaps best known for his role as The Infantata and Meep on the television series American Horror Story.

Of his love of pre-school teaching, Woolf said, "when you're with children, you kind of live in a different world that doesn't have any rules. It's more imagination."

Personal life
Woolf was diagnosed with pituitary dwarfism at an early age.

Honors
Two weeks before he died Woolf was honored in Moscow for his contributions to the horror genre at the Russian Horror Film Awards.

Death
Woolf died February 23, 2015, at age 34 from a stroke resulting from a head injury he received in a traffic accident while crossing the road. He was struck by the side-view mirror of a passing car in Los Angeles, California. Woolf later died at Cedars-Sinai Medical Center located in Los Angeles.

Filmography

Television

References

External links

1980 births
2015 deaths
21st-century American male actors
American male television actors
American male film actors
Actors from Fort Collins, Colorado
Actors with dwarfism
Male actors from Colorado
Road incident deaths in California